The West Virginia Democratic Party is the affiliate of the Democratic Party in the U.S. state of West Virginia.

History
The state of West Virginia granted itself statehood after its people, through a state constitutional convention, became a free state and broke away from the slave holding state of Virginia in 1861 during the first year of the Civil War. Article IV of the U.S. Constitution requires consent of the newly formed state, the original state, and Congress. Since the Virginian government was ruled illegitimate as it was a member of the Confederate States of America, no approval was required and after Congressional consent, self-statehood was gained and political party formation prospered.

The West Virginia Democratic Party was started as a coalition of conservative Pro-Union Democrats, Pro-Confederate Democrats, and former members of the Whig Party. After 1872, its political dominance flourished when restrictions that disenfranchised former Confederates were struck from the state constitution.

West Virginia Democrats in government
The West Virginia Democratic Party controls zero statewide executive office and holds minorities in both the West Virginia House of Delegates and the West Virginia Senate. Democrats hold one of the state's two U.S. Senate seats and none of the state's three U.S. House seats. Incumbent governor Jim Justice was elected as a Democrat in the 2016 election, however switched from the Democratic Party to the Republican Party in August 2017, seven months after taking office.

Federal

Judicial (West Virginia Supreme Court of Appeals) 
 Justice John A. Hutchison
 Justice William R. Wooton

Democratic electorate
Democratic and Republican parties have dominated the American political scene for close to two centuries. In West Virginia, the Republican Union-supporting party held political power in the state from 1863 to 1872. The Democrats took power in the 1872 elections and held it until 1896. Republicans once again had control in 1896 until 1932. During the Great Depression, The Democratic Party began its dominance that lasted until 2014.

Democratic dominance in West Virginia in the 1900s
From 1930 to 2014, Democrats held majorities in both chambers of the West Virginia Legislature.

Today's party organization
The party organization is governed by the West Virginia State Democratic Executive Committee. This committee comprises its leadership. The chair is Delegate Mike Pushkin and the vice chairwoman is Delegate Danielle Walker.

Notes

External links

 

 
Democratic Party (United States) by state
Democratic Party